Trudy Lynn (born August 9, 1947) is an American electric blues and soul blues singer and songwriter, whose recorded work has been released on twelve studio albums, one live album, and four compilation albums.

The Allmusic journalist, Alex Henderson, noted that "Lynn isn't one to hold back emotionally; like Koko Taylor and Etta James, she screams, shouts, testifies and gets her points across in a highly convincing way".

Biography
She was born Lee Audrey Nelms in the Fifth Ward, Houston, Texas, United States.

Her professional singing career began in the mid-1960s, when she sang with the guitarist Albert Collins and then later, Clarence Green. Use of her stage name of Trudy Lynn was in place when she performed with the Rhythmaires in the late 1960s. Her early work was in the rhythm and blues genre, and she once opened for Ike & Tina Turner. In the 1970s, Lynn expanded her performing base from clubs in Houston, to regional work and then overseas.

Lynn's recording career did not start until 1989, when Ichiban Records released the first of five albums she recorded for them. Her debut, Trudy Sings the Blues, included her cover version of "Ball 'n' Chain". It reached No. 76 in the US Billboard R&B albums chart. The following year, Come to Mama also peaked at No. 76 in the same chart. A mixture of southern soul and blues, her early albums were produced by Buzz Amato. Her 1999 release, U Don't Know What Time It Is, issued by Ruf Records, was short of double entendres in the lyrics, which had been a trademark up to that time. The album included keyboards input from Lucky Peterson, with Bernard Allison on guitar. Her live album, Blues Power: Trudy's Blues (2004), had guitar work by Carl Weathersby.

One of her most recent outputs was I'm Still Here, released in May 2006. It was recorded with the Calvin Owens Blues Orchestra. I'm Still Here was nominated for a Blues Music Award in 2007 in the 'Best Soul Blues Album' category. Lynn herself was nominated as 'Best Soul Blues Artist'. In 2014, Lynn was nominated for a Blues Music Award in the 'Koko Taylor Award (Traditional Blues Female)' category. Her album, Royal Oaks Blues Cafe, reached number one in the Billboard Top Blues Albums Chart in September 2014.

Festival work
At the Chicago Blues Festival, one newspaper journalist described her as "enthralling", whilst in her home town at the Juneteenth Blues Festival, she was described as the 'Blues Artist of the Year.' Lynn appeared at the Notodden Blues Festival in both 1999 and 2009, and with Little Milton at the San Francisco Blues Festival in 2001. In 2014, she performed at the Lucerne Blues Festival.

Discography

Studio albums

Live albums

Compilation albums

See also
List of electric blues musicians
List of soul-blues musicians

References

External links
Discography

1947 births
Living people
American soul singers
American blues singers
American rhythm and blues singers
American women singers
Musicians from Houston
Electric blues musicians
Soul-blues musicians
Songwriters from Texas
Ruf Records artists
Ichiban Records artists
21st-century American women